Tsiroanomandidy is a district of Bongolava in Madagascar.

Transports 
The national road RN 1 and Route nationale 1b connects the city with Antananarivo (218 km).

There is an airport.

Economy
Tsiroanomandidy has the largest Zebu market in Madagascar. More than 1/3 of the tax revenue of the town come from its trade.

Communes
The district is further divided into 18 communes; which are further sub-divided into 215 villages (fokontany):

 Ambalanirana - 16 villages - 450 km2 with a population of 27,805
 Ambararatabe - 7 villages - 120 km2 with a population of 11,699
 Ambatolampy - 10 villages - 152 km2 with a population of 12,584
 Ankadinondry Sakay - 22 villages - 376 km2 with a population of 45,522
 Ankerana Avaratra - 7 villages - 800 km2 with a population of 11,833
 Anosy - 7 villages -209  km2 with a population of 12,582
 Belobaka - 18 villages - 137 km2 with a population of 24,346
 Bemahatazana - 12 villages - 1,100 km2 with a population of 36,498
 Bevato - 12 villages - 357 km2 with a population of 20,360
 Fierenana - 11 villages - 3,336 km2 with a population of  21 625
 Fihaonana - 20 villages - 1,777 km2 with a population of 63,007
 Mahasolo - 16 villages - 934 km2 with a population of 45,485
 Maroharana - 7 villages - 450 km2 with a population of 12,343
 Miandanarivo - 11 villages - 400 km2 with a population of 17,438
 Soanierana - 6 villages - 248 km2 with a population of 9,285
 Tsinjoarivo Imanga - 10 villages - 450 km2 with a population of 31,213
 Tsiroanomandidy - 16 villages - 52 km2 with a population of 42,989

References 

Districts of Bongolava